Alan Ereira is a British author, historian and documentary filmmaker.  He is a Professor of Practice at the University of Wales, Trinity St. David.

Life
Educated at Kilburn Grammar School, Ereira subsequently worked at the BBC on television and radio since 1965 contributing documentaries to the Timewatch strand amongst others

He has been awarded the Japan Prize for his 1978 documentary on the Battle of the Somme, and the Royal Television Society Best Documentary Series award for his 1988 documentary on the Armada.

Ereira directed a documentary called From the Heart of the World - The Elder Brother's Warning (1990) for the British Broadcasting Corporation. In this film he documented his unique visits to the Kogi people of Colombia, an indigenous ('Indian') ethnic group which survived attempts by the Spanish conquerors to destroy them by retreating high up into the mountainous area of the Sierra Nevada, where they now live. These meetings were only allowed by the Kogi Mamos who normally restrict any direct interaction with the modern world. In Ereira's case, the Mamos made an exception as they saw him as the filmmaker they wanted to convey their message to the world.

Ereira regards the Kogi as unique amongst indigenous peoples in the Americas in that they have managed to retain their traditional culture almost entirely intact. Since the 1980s, the Kogi have warned, on the basis of their observation of ecological changes in the Sierra Nevada, that the world is facing an ecological catastrophe. They asked Ereira to make his films about them to warn the rest of the world (and particularly the West) that it needs to radically change its way of living, and its exploitative attitude to the natural world, if it is to avert this catastrophe. Ereira later wrote about the filming of the documentary in his book The Heart of the World (1990). This book has been republished and retitled as The Elder Brothers (1992) and The Elder Brothers' Warning (2009).

Aluna is the sequel documentary to The Heart of the World: Elder Brother's Warning and was made by an indigenous film crew and the Kogi Mamos in collaboration with Ereira. This is to be the final warning to the world by the Kogi Mamos, as it is apparent to them that the world did not heed their original warning in the first documentary. Ereira collaborated with Terry Jones on the documentary series Crusades (1995), Terry Jones' Medieval Lives (2004) and Terry Jones' Barbarians (2006), with whom he also co-authored the respective companion books.

In 2004 he also presented, wrote and produced a 6-part documentary series on the kings and queens of England for UKTV History.

Filmography
 1988 Armada producer, writer & narrator
 1990 From the Heart of the World: The Elder Brothers' Warning producer, director, & writer
 1995 Crusades producer, director & writer
 2004 Terry Jones' Medieval Lives associate producer & writer
 2004 Kings and Queens of England producer, writer & presenter
 2006 Terry Jones' Barbarians producer & writer
 2012 Aluna producer & director

Bibliography

External links
Information about his work in South America
Official website of the second and final Kogi Mamos documentary, archived from the Original on 2 October 2013 using the Wayback Machine
LinkTV video chat with Alan Ereira

British writers
Living people
English people of Portuguese descent
Year of birth missing (living people)